Anthophila ludifica is a moth in the family Choreutidae. It was described by Edward Meyrick in 1914. It is found in Nigeria.

References

Choreutidae
Moths described in 1914